Archbishop Gregor Leonhard Andreas von Scherr (22 June 1804 – 24 October 1877), OSB was Archbishop of Munich and Freising from 1856 until 1877.

Biography
Born on 22 June 1804, Neunburg vorm Wald, he was ordained on 4 August 1829, aged 25 as a priest of Regensburg, Germany by Cardinal Antonio Saverio De Luca. On 29 December 1833, aged 29, he joined the Order of Saint Benedict (OSB) and later became Abbot of St. Michael's Abbey at Metten.

On 6 January 1856, aged 51, he was appointed Archbishop of Munich and Freising. He was confirmed as Archbishop on 19 June 1856, aged 52, and installed two months later. Von Scherr endeavoured to preserve the Catholic character of the schools. For the maintenance of the lesser seminaries of the diocese which had been obliged to receive an exceptionally large number of candidates to the priesthood, he founded St. Corbinian's Association, and erected a lesser seminary in Freising. He introduced into his diocese the devotion of the Perpetual Adoration of the Blessed Sacrament, and instituted pastoral conferences of the clergy. 

At the First Vatican Council, he voted with the minority, but submitted at once to the decision of the council. In April 1871 Bishop Von Scherr excommunicated Ignaz von Döllinger, professor at the University of Munich, for his concerted opposition to the Council's decrees.
 
The last years of his episcopate were embittered by the support which the Bavarian Government, under the leadership of Lutz, minister of worship, gave to the Old Catholic movement, whose most zealous champions were resident in Munich. 

He died on 24 October 1877, aged 73. He was a priest for 48 years and a bishop for 21 years.

References

External links
Catholic Hierarchy

1804 births
1877 deaths
People from Schwandorf (district)
Members of the Bavarian Reichsrat
Roman Catholic archbishops of Munich and Freising
19th-century Roman Catholic archbishops in Germany
Burials at Munich Frauenkirche
German Benedictines
19th-century Roman Catholic archbishops in Bavaria
German Roman Catholic archbishops